Andrés Robinson (born 16 June 1952) is a sailor from Argentina, who represented his country at the 1976 Summer Olympics in Kingston, Ontario, Canada as crew member in the Soling. With helmsman Pedro Ferrero and fellow crew member Jorge Rão they took the 20th place.

References

Living people
1952 births
Sailors at the 1976 Summer Olympics – Soling
Olympic sailors of Argentina
Argentine male sailors (sport)